Spinning Into Butter  is a 2007 drama film written by Rebecca Gilman and Doug Atchison and loosely based on Gilman's play of the same name.  It was directed by first-time director Mark Brokaw and produced by Sarah Jessica Parker, who also stars in the film.  Spinning Into Butter was sold for distribution Cannes Film Market on May 17, 2007 and opened in the U.S. in March, 2009. The film concerns political correctness and racial identity.

Premise 
When a New England liberal arts college experiences a hate crime against one of its few black students, the school's dean of students (Parker) must respond publicly to the incident while privately confronting her own latent racism and prejudice.

Cast 
 Sarah Jessica Parker as Sarah Daniels
 Miranda Richardson as Catherine Kenney
 Beau Bridges as Burton Strauss
 Paul James as Simon Brick
 Mykelti Williamson as Aaron Carmicheal
 Victor Rasuk as Patrick Chibas
 Betsy Beutler as Lee

Reception 
As of March 2018, the review aggregator website Rotten Tomatoes reported that 16% of critics gave the film positive reviews, based on 32 reviews with an average score of 3.6/10.  The site's consensus of reviews was:
"Both leaden and stilted, Spinning Into Butter is an unsubtle drama with stagy direction and lackluster dialogue."

References

External links
 

2007 films
2007 drama films
Films about race and ethnicity
American drama films
Political correctness
Films set in Vermont
2007 directorial debut films
2000s English-language films
2000s American films